Oligodon cattienensis, also known as the Cat Tien kukri snake, is a species of snake of the family Colubridae. It is endemic to the Đồng Nai province of Vietnam. The snake was named after Cat Tien National Park, the location of its discovery.

References 

cattienensis
Snakes of Vietnam
Endemic fauna of Vietnam
Reptiles described in 2013
Taxa named by Wolfgang Böhme (herpetologist)